Centre Point is a building in Central London, comprising a 34-storey tower; a 9-storey block to the east including shops, offices, retail units and maisonettes; and a linking block between the two at first-floor level. It occupies 101–103 New Oxford Street and 5–24 St Giles High Street, WC1, with a frontage also to Charing Cross Road, close to St Giles Circus and almost directly above Tottenham Court Road tube station. The site was once occupied by a gallows, and the tower sits directly over the former route of St Giles High Street, which had to be re-routed for the construction.

It stood empty from the time of its completion until 1975, and was briefly occupied by housing activists in 1974. Since 1995 it has been a Grade II listed building. In 2015 it was converted from office space to flats.

Construction and history
The building was designed by George Marsh of the architects R. Seifert and Partners, with engineers Pell Frischmann, and was constructed by Wimpey Construction from 1963 to 1966 for £5.5 million. The precast segments were formed of fine concrete, utilising crushed Portland stone; they were made by Portcrete Limited at Portland, Isle of Portland, Dorset, and transported to London by lorry.

Centre Point was built as speculative office space by property tycoon Harry Hyams, who had leased the site at £18,500 a year for 150 years. Hyams intended that the whole building be occupied by a single tenant, and negotiated fiercely for its approval.

On completion, the building remained vacant for many years, leading to its being referred to as "London's Empty Skyscraper". With property prices rising and most business tenancies taken for set periods of 10 or 15 years, Hyams could afford to keep it empty and wait for his single tenant at the asking price of £1,250,000; he was challenged to allow tenants to rent single floors, but consistently refused. At that time skyscrapers were rare in London, and Centre Point's prominence led to its becoming a rallying symbol for opponents. The homeless charity Centrepoint was founded in 1969 as a homeless shelter in nearby Soho, named Centrepoint in response to the building Centre Point being seen as an "affront to the homeless" for being left empty to make money for the property developer.

In 1974 an umbrella group of Direct Action housing campaigners, including Jim Radford, Ron Bailey and Jack Dromey, organised a weekend occupation of Centre Point from 18 January to 20 January to draw attention to its being deliberately left empty during a housing crisis in London. (Two of the occupiers had obtained jobs with the Burns Security Company, which was guarding the building.)

From July 1980 to March 2014, Centre Point was the headquarters of the Confederation of British Industry (CBI) which became, at 33 years and seven months, the building's longest-standing tenant.

In October 2005, Centre Point was bought from the previous owners, Blackmoor LP, by commercial property firm Targetfollow for £85 million. The building was extensively refurbished.  occupants included US talent agency William Morris; the state-owned national oil company of Saudi Arabia, Aramco; Chinese oil company PetroChina; and electronic gaming company EA Games.

It has since been purchased by Almacantar. Almacantar approached Conran and Partners for the refurbishment of the tower including change of use from office to residential, whilst MICA, formerly Rick Mather Architects, led the refurbishment of the lower rise buildings and the new affordable housing block. In 2015 work began on conversion of the building to residential flats. The restoration and conversion of the tower to a residential building was finished in March 2018. Much as had been the case at its original opening, the refurbished tower remains largely empty, with few windows lit in the evenings, the rest in darkness, despite at least half its units being sold. This has led to it being called one of London's "ghost towers".

Transport

The promised transport interchange and highways improvements were not delivered following the original plan. The pedestrian subway attracted anti-social activities. On 19 June 2006, the Commission for Architecture and the Built Environment pointed to the building as an example of bad design, where badly-designed pavements force pedestrians into the bus lane and account for the highest level of pedestrian injuries in Central London. With the planned redevelopment of Tottenham Court Road Underground Station, a framework has been adopted to redevelop the traffic island beneath Centre Point as an open space.

Architectural reception
Architecture critic Nikolaus Pevsner described Centre Point as "coarse in the extreme". In 1995 it became a Grade II listed building. In 2009, it won the Concrete Society's Mature Structures Award.

Cultural references
 
 Centre Point is featured in the 1977 horror film The Medusa Touch. A Boeing 747 aircraft is seen to hit the top of the tower and destroy it. The resulting collapse engulfs the nearby Dominion Theatre.
 Centre Point is one of the locations Jim (Cillian Murphy) walks past in the "deserted London" scenes of UK horror film 28 Days Later (2002). Director Danny Boyle also references it (as "'Centre Point,' the famous empty/partially empty building in this busy section of London") on the DVD commentary.
 The character "Old Bailey" camps on top of Centre Point at one point in Neil Gaiman's novel Neverwhere.  He describes it as an "ugly and distinctive Sixties skyscraper" and goes on to remark that "the view from the top was without compare, and, furthermore, the top of Centre Point was one of the few places in the West End of London where you did not have to look at Centre Point itself".
 The building is mentioned in the sixth episode of the fourth series of the BBC comedy series The Thick of It. During an inquiry into the UK government's routine leaking of information to the press, Stuart Pearson, a Conservative spin doctor, is asked about an analogy he has made between government transparency and the Pompidou Centre. A member of the inquiry suggests that rather than creating a "political Pompidou Centre," Pearson has created "the opposite, Centre Point – I mean everyone sees it looming over them but nobody has the faintest idea what happens in there." To which Pearson replies, "I think there's some kind of club on the top floor."
 In an episode of Captain Kremmen, the titular character is forced to fire a "Thron" ray into London by his Krell captors, but avoids any deaths by aiming it at Centre Point, which was empty.
 For a number of years up until January 2022, two members of The Sidemen (KSI and Simon Minter) lived in a three bedroom apartment there.  They streamed a number of videos as individual and also filmed a number of videos with The Sidemen as a group.

See also
 Tall buildings in London
 List of skyscrapers

References

External links

 
 Targetfollow.co.uk – Owner of Centre Point
 Targetspace.co.uk – Office Services in Centre Point
 BBC News: Hunt for UK's 'failed' buildings
 Concrete Society: Certificate of Excellence for Centre Point
 Centre Point by Richard Seifert
 Centre Point building information & photos

Skyscrapers in the London Borough of Camden
Grade II listed buildings in the London Borough of Camden
Richard Seifert buildings
Brutalist architecture in London
Skyscraper office buildings in London
Office buildings completed in 1966